Baiona can refer to at least two places:

Baiona, the Basque and Occitan name for Bayonne, a city of Labourd, Basque Country, France
Baiona, Pontevedra, a municipality in Galicia, Spain

See also
Bayonne (disambiguation)